Hermann Fol (23 July 1845, Saint-Mandé – 13 March 1892) was a Swiss zoologist and the father of modern cytology.

After studying medicine and zoology with Ernst Haeckel (1834–1919) at the University of Jena where he was a pupil of François Jules Pictet de la Rive (1809–1872) and René-Édouard Claparède (1832-1871), he accompanied Haeckel on a prolonged scientific journey (1866 and 1867) around the coasts of West Africa and of the Canary Islands. On his return to Europe he undertook medical studies in Heidelberg and completed them by obtaining his diploma in 1869 in Zurich and Berlin. In 1871 he studied planktonic fauna in Villefranche-sur-Mer on the recommendation of Carl Vogt (1817–1895). In 1876, he observed the penetration of a spermatozoon into an egg becoming thus a pioneer of the microscopic studies of fertilisation and cellular division. Oscar Hertwig also observed this in the same year.

In 1878, Fol obtained a post of professor at the University of Geneva. In 1886, he resigned from his post in Geneva to devote himself entirely to his research in Villefranche-sur-Mer where, in 1880, he had established a small marine laboratory with Jules Henri Barrois (1852–1943). Then, financially aided by the French government to carry out a study of distribution of sponges on the Tunisian and Greek coasts, he departed Le Havre on his new yacht, l' Aster, on March 13, 1892, accompanied by several team members. After a stopover in Bénodet, the yacht disappeared at sea, and Fol was never seen again.

Barthometer

Fol is credited with the invention of the barthometer. The barometer properly measured mercury, the pressure to which the apparatus had been submitted, and the determination of the depth of compressible liquid within the device. His invention consisted of a spherical glass reservoir of a liquid that is slightly compressible, such as water or ether. The single hole to the vessel is a capillary tube that corresponds with a minor reservoir filled with mercury. Mercury, along the assumed temperature of the water at the sea bottom, must remain at the stage with the hole in the pointed stopper within the large reservoir. The top surface of the mercury is released to contact the water. The device is lowered by the sound line. The water or ether will compress as the device lowers, a given amount of each atmosphere of pressure, and a correlating amount of mercury will release between the hole and lower to the base of the bottom reservoir.

Works
Études sur les Appendiculaires du Détroit de Messine; Genf, Ramboz et Schuchardt, 1872.
Die erste Entwickelung des Geryonideneies; Jena Zeitschr. 7. 471–492. pl. 24, 25. 1873
Études sur le développement des mollusques. Premier mémoire : Sur le développement des ptéropodes; Paris, France : Centre National de la recherche scientifique, 1875?
Note sur l'origine première des produits sexuels; Paris, Arch. sci. phys. nat. 1875. 53. 104-111
Études sur le développement des mollusques. [Premier mémoire. Sur le développement des ptéropodes]; Paris, C. Reinwald, 1875
Études sur le développement des mollusques. 1–3, 1875–1880; Archives de zool. exper. 4. 1875. 1–214. pl. 1–10; 5. 1876. 1-54. pl. 1–4; 8. 1880. 103–232. pl. 9-18
Ueber die Schleimdrüse oder den Endostyl der Tunicaten; Morphol. Jahrb. 1876. 1. 222–242. pl. 7.
Ein neues Compressorium; Morphol. Jahrbuch. 2. 1876. 440-444
Sopra i fenomeni intimi della fecondazione degli echinodermi; Transunti R. Accad. Lincei, Rom, 1. 1877. 181-183
Sur quelques fécondations anormales chez l'étoile de mer; Compter rendus Acad. sci. Paris. 84. 1877. 659-661
Sur les phénomènes intimes de la division cellulaire; Paris, Comp. rend. Acad. sci Paris. 1876. 83. 667-669
Sur les phénomènes intimes de la fécondation; Comptes rendus Acad. sci. Paris. 84. 268–271. 1877
Sur le premier développement d'une étoile de mer [Asterias glacialis]; Comptes rendus Acad. sci. Paris. 84. 1877. 357-360
Sur les premiers phénomènes de développement des echinodermes. Asterias glacialis; Rev. scient. de la France et de l'étranger. (2), xiii, 300. 1877
Recherches sur la fécondation et le commencement de l'hénogénie chez divers animaux; Genf, 1879
Contribution à la connaissance de la famille Tintinnodea; Genf, Bureau des archives, 1881
Sur le Sticholonche Zanclea et un nouvel ordre de Rhizopodes; Genf, Georg, 1882
Sur la production artificielle de l'inversion viscérale, ou heterotaxie chez des embryons de poulet; Comptes rendus Acad. sci. Paris. 1883 (mit Édouard Sarasin)
Sur l'anatomie d'un embryon humain de la quatrième semaine; Comptes-rendus Acad. sci. Paris. 97. 1883. 1563-1566
Sur l'origine de l'individualité chez les animaux supérieurs; Comptes-rendus Acad. sci. Paris. 97. 1883. 497-499
Sur l'origine des cellules du follicule et de l'ovule chez les ascidies et chez d'autres animaux; Comptes rendus Acad. sci. Paris. 96. 1883. 1591-1594
Sur la profondeur à laquelle la lumière du jour penètre dans les eaux de la mer; Paris, 1884*Sur la pénétration de la lumière du jour dans les eaux du lac de Genève; Paris, 1884 (with Sarasin)
Sur un appareil photographique destiné à prendre des poses d'animaux en mouvement; Archives des sciences physiques et naturelles ([de la] Bibliothèque Universelle) Troisième période, t(ome) 11. 11. (No. 5.15) Mai 1884
Nouvelle méthode pour le transvasage de bouillons stérilisés et le dosage des germes vivants contenus dans l'eau; Genf, 1884 Recueil zoologique Suisse; Genf, Georg, 1884
Sur l'effet d'un repos prolongé et sur celui d'un filtrage par la porcelaine sur la pureté de l'eau; Genf, 1885 (mit Pierre Louis Dunant)
Les microbes : résumé de deux conférences données à l'aula de l'Université de Genève en janvier 1885; Genf, Georg, 1885 Les microbes; Genf, Georg, 1885
Sur la queue de l'embryon humain; Paris, 1885
Deux laboratoires zoologiques sur le littoral méditerranéen de la France; Genf, 1884
Beiträge zur histologischen Technik; : Zeitschrift f. Wissensch. Zoologie. 38. 1884. 491-495
Recherches sur le nombre des germes vivants que renferment quelques eaux de Genève et des environs; Mémoires de la Société de physique et d'histoire naturelle de Genève, Tome 29, No. 3. Genève 1884 (with Pierre-Louis Dunant)
Zoologie générale : Leçons données à l'Université de Genève pendant le semester d'hiver 1882-83; Genf, H. Georg, 1884
Les Microbes : Résumé de deux Conférences données à l'Autor l'Université de Genève en Janvier 1885 (avec 5 Planches hors texte); Genf, 1885 Genève et son université; Genf, Imprimerie Charles Schuchardt, 1886
Zoologie et physiologie; Arch. des sci. phys. et nat. (3). 16. 327-October  1886
Sur la pénétration de la lumière dans la profondeur de la mer à diverses heures du jour; Paris, 1886 (Édouard Sarasin)
Lehrbuch der vergleichenden mikroskopischen Anatomie Lfg.1. Die mikroskopisch-anatomische Technik; Leipzig Engelmann 1884
Lehrbuch der vergleichenden mikroskopischen Anatomie, mit Einschluss der vergleichenden Histologie und Histogenie; Leipzig, Wilhelm Engelmann, 1884
[Letter of resignation]; Genf, 1886
Pénétration de la lumière du jour dans les eaux du lac de Genève et dans celles de la Méditerranée; Mémoires de la Société de physique et d'histoire naturelle de Genève, Tome 29, No. 13. Genève 1887
Réponse à quelques objections formulées contre mes idées sur la pénétration du zoosperme; Paris, 1887
Sur le commencement de l'hénogénie chez divers animaux; Arch. sci. phys. et naturelles. Geneve. 58. 439–472. 1877
Le quadrille des centres : un épisode nouveau dans l'histoire de la fécondation : (extrait); Genf, Impr. Aubert-Schuchardt, 1891
La lumière dans l'interieur de la mer; Neptunia. 1. 277–279; 1891
Lehrbuch der vergleichenden mikroskopischen Anatomie Lfg.2. Die Zelle; Leipzig Engelmann 1896
Recherches sur la fécondation et le commencement de l'hénogénie chez divers animaux; Genf, 1897
Die Zelle; Leipzig, Engelmann, 1896

See also
 List of people who disappeared

References

External links
Historischen Lexikon der Schweiz
Multimedia Presentation about Hermann Fol

1845 births
1890s missing person cases
1892 deaths
Missing person cases in France
People lost at sea
19th-century Swiss zoologists
University of Jena alumni